Grigore Moisil National College may refer to one of four educational institutions in Romania:

Grigore Moisil National College of Computer Science (Brașov)
Grigore Moisil National College (Bucharest)
Grigore Moisil National College (Onești)
Grigore Moisil National College (Urziceni)

Grigore Moisil High School may refer to one of three educational institutions in Romania:

Grigore Moisil High School (Bucharest)
Grigore Moisil High School (Timișoara)
Grigore Moisil High School (Tulcea)